Günter Helmut Baumann (born 1 August 1947 in Annaberg-Buchholz, Saxony) is a German politician and member of the CDU. An engineer by profession, Baumann has been a member of the Christian Democratic Union (East Germany) since 1972 until that party merged with its West German counterpart in 1990. From 1990 to 1998 he served as the mayor of Jöhstadt. Since 1998, he has been a directly elected member of the Bundestag, representing the constituencies of Annaberg – Stollberg – Zschopau (1998-2002), Annaberg – Aue-Schwarzenberg (2002 - 2009) and Erzgebirgskreis I since 2009.

External links 
 Official website 

1947 births
Living people
People from Annaberg-Buchholz
German Lutherans
Christian Democratic Union (East Germany) politicians
TU Dresden alumni
Mayors of places in Saxony
Members of the Bundestag for Saxony
Members of the Bundestag 2013–2017
Members of the Bundestag 2005–2009
Members of the Bundestag 2002–2005
Members of the Bundestag 1998–2002
Members of the Bundestag for the Christian Democratic Union of Germany